The Little King (French: Le petit roi) is a 1933 French drama film directed by Julien Duvivier and starring Robert Lynen, Arlette Marchal and Béatrice Bretty.

The film's sets were designed by the art director Lucien Aguettand. It was shot at the Joinville Studios in Paris with location filming in various places including the resort town of Saint-Tropez.

It was made as a follow-up to Duvivier's 1932 hit The Red Head, which also starred Robert Lynen in the title role.

Synopsis
A boy inherits the throne of a fictional European country. The young Michel VIII is surrounded by untrustworthy advisors and threatened by revolutionaries. He goes to the French Riviera to recover his health, but then returns to his homeland.

Cast
 Robert Lynen as Michel VIII  
 Arlette Marchal as La comtesse Slasko  
 Béatrice Bretty as Barbara  
 Jean Toulout as Le comte Marski  
 Marcel Vallée as Storeck  
 Georgé as Le chambellan  
 Hubert Prélier as Pierre Zoltyk  
 Paule Andral as La régente  
 Julien Clément as Le professeur Bonnard  
 Camille Bert as Le professeur d'histoire  
 Robert Le Vigan as Le fou  
 Charles Camus as Le docteur Jacklow  
 Jeanne Méa as Madame de Stenne  
 Marcel Carpentier as Le régent Paul  
 Louis Vasseur as Le colonel Kremof  
 Maurice Schutz as Métropolitain  
 Patricia Windrow as Lillie

References

Bibliography 
 McCann, Ben. Julien Duvivier. Oxford University Press, 2017.

External links 
 

1933 films
French drama films
1933 drama films
1930s French-language films
Films directed by Julien Duvivier
Films set in Europe
Pathé films
Films shot at Joinville Studios
French black-and-white films
1930s French films